The Cantabrian Football Federation (FCF) is the body responsible for managing association football in the Cantabria autonomous region. Its offices are in Santander.

History
The federation was officially created on 8 April 1923, after several reunions in the previous year to establish a regional championship happened. Domingo Solís was elected as its first president. The first regional championship took place during the 1922–23 season, with Racing de Santander being crowned champions.

Competitions
The Cantabrian Football Federation organises the following competitions:
Tercera División, Group 3
RFEF Cantabria tournament (Regional phase of the Federation Cup)
Copa Cantabria Juvenil (Cantabria Youth Cup)
Liga Cántabra Juvenil (Cantabria Youth League)
Liga Cántabra Femenina (Cantabria Women's Football League)
Copa Cantabria Femenina (Basque Women's Cup)

See also
Divisiones Regionales de Fútbol in Cantabria
List of Spanish regional football federations

References

External links 
 

Spanish football associations
Football in Cantabria
1923 establishments in Spain
Sports organizations established in 1923